Greece sent for the first time in history a delegation to compete at the 1976 Summer Paralympics in Toronto, Ontario, Canada. Its athletes failed in winning any medal and finished in the 34th and last place along with seven other countries.

See also 
 1976 Summer Paralympics
 Greece at the 1976 Summer Olympics

References 

Nations at the 1976 Summer Paralympics
1976
Summer Paralympics